The Rudram (IAST:  Rudram, meaning remover of sorrows) is a series of air-to-surface ground attack and anti-radiation missiles in development by the Defence Research and Development Organisation of India. It can be launched from a range of altitudes with large standoff distance for destroying enemy surveillance radars, communication stations and bunkers. It will be manufactured jointly by Bharat Dynamics Limited and Bharat Electronics Limited after trials and introduction. DRDO also involved Adani Defence and Aerospace under Development cum Production Partner programme for mass production.

Description 
Defence Research and Development Laboratory is the primary agency which carried out the design and development of the missile system along with Armament Research and Development Establishment, Defence Electronics Research Laboratory, High Energy Materials Research Laboratory, Research Centre Imarat and Terminal Ballistics Research Laboratory. Many subsystem level developmental works were outsourced to private sector players. Software Development Institute of the Indian Air Force (IAF) helped in the integration of DRDO ARM with Sukhoi Su-30MKI while the Hindustan Aeronautics Limited (HAL), Nasik Division did the AKU-58 launcher modification which undertook extensive wind-tunnel tests at National Trisonic Aerodynamic Facilities division of National Aerospace Laboratories, Bengaluru.

DRDO ARM has a range of 100–250 km which is made to be integrated with Sukhoi Su-30MKI as its primary test platform, although can be used with Dassault Mirage 2000, SEPECAT Jaguar, HAL Tejas and HAL Tejas Mark 2/MWF in future. According to the then Director of Research Centre Imarat, G. Satheesh Reddy, the missile will feature a millimetre wave seeker (mmW) transmitting on frequencies of 30 gigahertz and above while capable of lock-on before launch and lock-on after launch modes. Mid-course guidance is accomplished through inertial navigation system and two-way datalink combined with Global Positioning System/NavIC satellite guidance through digital filtering as fall back to correct accumulated errors and a passive homing head (PHH) seeker which is developed by Defence Electronics Research Laboratory that can detect radio frequency emissions from 100 km away. PHH is a wide-band receiver system operating within D band to J band frequency of the electromagnetic spectrum. Its compact front-end structure is due to the use of monolithic microwave integrated circuit (MMIC) technology for identification of radiation emitting sources.

The missile is a single-stage, approximately 5.5-metre in length and 600 kg of weight with cruciform wing surface to increase high maneuverability and to give constant aerodynamic characteristics similar to Astra beyond-visual-range missile. It uses pre-fragmented warhead with optical proximity fuze and is powered by a dual-pulsed solid rocket motor made by Premier Explosives Limited under technology transfer from DRDO. The dual-pulsed solid rocket motor produces variable thrust within a range of 0.6 to 2 Mach that reduces the overall reaction time while widening the targeting envelope as well as the engagement capability. DRDO ARM can target mobile integrated air-defence system as well as radar station that shutdown to avoid detection.

Development and trials 

Development had begun by April 2012 at Defence Research and Development Laboratory. The feasibility studies were done in 2012–2013 with the aim is to develop a fully indigenous tactical, anti-radiation capable missile for the Indian Air force (IAF) which is comparable to AGM-88E AARGM, MAR-1, Kh-31P and better than Martel or Kh-25MP.

From 2014, the development of missile picked up interest of the IAF. As of 2014, missile design and hardware development are in progress with first successful flight trial to happen before year 2017. IAF was initially very concerned with the higher weight and shorter range of new missile compare to the western ones due to the use of bulky Russian made radio frequency (RF) seekers. IAF at the same time was also negotiating with USA for 1,500 AGM-88E which IAF was planning to induct in the next five years. The technologies that were developed by DRDO for NGARM are wide-band passive seeker, milli-metric wave active seeker, radome for the seekers and dual-pulsed propulsion system which are mostly lessons learnt during the development of Astra and Barak 8.

The Captive Flight Trial–1 of DRDO ARM was completed in April/May 2016 by No. 20 Squadron of IAF which checked the performance of seeker, navigation and control system, structural capability and aerodynamic vibrations while the Drop Flight Trial was completed by December 2016 with the missile released by Sukhoi Su-30MKI at a speed of 0.8 Mach, from 6.5 km altitude. Further carriage flight test was carried out to check mechanical/electrical integration as well as software interfacing of the missile before the maiden flight on 18 January 2018, where the missile was successfully flight tested for the first time on parametres such as auto-launch sequence, store separation, control guidance, aerodynamics, thermal batteries, airframe and propulsion without a seeker which were all proven successful. On 25 January 2019, NGARM was fired from a Sukhoi Su-30MKI over Bay of Bengal off the coast of Odisha that hit the designated target with a high degree of accuracy. The missile achieved an accuracy within 10 m CEP covering a range of 100 km. The developmental test proved the performance of seeker, structural integrity of the missile, correct functioning of navigation and control system while validation of aerodynamic capability. The missile can strike at distances double the intended range depending upon the altitude. NGARM will further undergo series of carriage and release flight trials to check the performance of seekers against a different range of targets.

Next trials during the period of July to August 2019 will be conducted initially to check the performance of indigenous passive seeker developed by Defence Electronics Research Laboratory with further test for an active seeker at later stage. While the crucial sensor technology is yet to be fully mastered by DRDO, the IAF wants fast track development of NGARM due to urgent requirement of newer anti-radiation missile. NGARM developmental trials will resume from 2020 after a gap of two years.

The DRDO Anti-Radiation Missile or NGARM now officially named Rudram-1 was successfully test-fired from Integrated Test Range, Balasore on 9 October 2020. DRDO is planning final test flight between 28 and 29 December 2021 before moving Rudram-1 for serial production from 2022.

Induction
According to report, the plan is to make the missile a part of the Air Force by 2022 after conducting six to seven more tests. The missile's passive homing head can detect, classify and engage targets over a wide band of frequencies as programmed.

Production 
Indian Air Force started working on a proposal to place ₹1,400 crore order for Rudram-1. It was already under review in Ministry of Defence (MoD) and awaiting final call from senior officials.

Future development 
DRDO is planning to bring further software improvements to handle a larger variety of targets under various operational conditions while developing a separate ground-based variant to be launched from mobile launcher. DRDO is developing Rudram-2 with a range of 300 km and air to ground version Rudram-3 with 550 km range.

See also 

 Hormoz-2
 AGM-88 HARM 
 ALARM missile
 Kh-31
 MAR-1 
 YJ-91

References

External links
Technical:
 DRDO Technology Focus : Warhead for Missiles, Torpedoes and Rockets

Air-to-surface missiles
Anti-radiation missiles of India
Guided missiles of India
Defence Research and Development Organisation